Vasu, popularly known as Halwa Vasu, (died 17 August 2017) was a comedian in the Tamil film industry in India. He worked in around 900 films.

Career

Vasu who hailed from Madurai district, came to Chennai to work in cinemas after his graduation. Vasu worked as an assistant to director-actor Manivannan, he carved a niche for himself in comedy films and has also acted alongside the likes of Vadivelu. He was given the name "Halwa Vasu" after the film Amaidhi Padai (1994), in which he brings halwa which is adulterated with abin, a drug, by the antagonist in the movie who uses it to rape an innocent girl.

Death
He was hospitalized for some time but died due to liver failure at his home on 17 August 2017.

Selected filmography

Films

Vaazhkai Chakkaram (1990)
Sandhana Kaatru (1990)
Pudhu Manithan (1991)
Vetri Padigal (1991)
Marikozhundhu (1991)
Therku Theru Machan (1992)
Unnai Vaazhthi Paadugiren (1992)
Government Mappillai (1992)
Moondravadhu Kann (1993)
Amaidhi Padai (1994)
Rasa Magan (1994)
Chinna Mani (1995)
Thamizhachi (1995)
Maaman Magal (1995)
Murai Mappillai (1995)
Villadhi Villain (1995)
Mettukudi (1996)
Gopura Deepam (1997)
Arunachalam (1997)
Vivasaayi Magan (1997)
Periya Idathu Mappillai (1997)
Periya Manushan (1997)
Pudhalvan (1997)
Dhinamdhorum (1998)
Ninaithen Vandhai (1998)
Iniyavale (1998)
Moovendhar (1998)
Kannathal (1998)
Unnai Thedi (1999)
Poomagal Oorvalam (1999)
Suyamvaram (1999)
Kannodu Kanbathellam (1999)
Azhagarsamy (1999)
Annai (2000)
Kannan Varuvaan (2000)
 Citizen (2001)
Karmegham (2002)
Anbu (2003)
Student Number 1 (2003)
Magic Magic 3D (2003)
Diwan (2003)
Winner (2003)
Gomathi Nayagam (2004)
Englishkaran (2005)
Kaatrullavarai (2005)
February 14 (2005)
ABCD (2005)
Chanakya (2005)
Mazhai (2005)
Aanai (2005)
Aaru (2005)
Vetrivel Sakthivel (2005)
Veeranna (2005)
Pasa Kiligal (2006)
Kovai Brothers (2006)
Sudesi (2006)
Imsai Arasan 23rd Pulikecei (2006)
Sillunu Oru Kaadhal (2006)
Kurukshetram (2006)
Karuppusamy Kuththagaithaarar (2007)
Vel (2007)
Manikanda (2007)
Piragu (2007)
Indiralohathil Na Azhagappan (2008)
Kannum Kannum (2008)
Pandi (2008)
Kathavarayan (2008)
Kee Mu (2008)
Pattaya Kelappu (2008)
Velvi (2008)
Theeyavan (2008)
Ellam Avan Seyal (2008)
Vedigundu Murugesan (2009)
Kanthaswamy (2009)
Kannukulle (2009)
Vedappan (2009)
Thamizh Padam (2010)
Mandhira Punnagai (2010)
Nagaram Marupakkam (2010)
Neeyum Naanum (2010)
Chikku Bukku (2010)
Aadukalam (2011)
Kazhugu (2012)
Sonna Puriyathu (2013)
Masani (2013)
Ner Ethir (2014)
Tenaliraman (2014)
Agathinai (2015)
Visaranai (2015)
Peigal Jaakkirathai (2016)
Savarikkadu (2017)
Naan Avalai Sandhitha Pothu (2019)
Sollunganne Sollunga (2020)

Television
Mama Maaple as Doctor

Dubbing artist
Ullathai Allitha (1996) - Rambha (for scene where rambha disguises as thief)

References

External links
 

1960s births
2017 deaths
Tamil comedians
Tamil male actors
Indian male film actors
Male actors from Madurai
Indian male comedians
20th-century Indian male actors
21st-century Indian male actors
Male actors in Tamil cinema
Deaths from liver failure